The 1990 European Cup Winners' Cup Final was a football match contested between Sampdoria of Italy and Anderlecht of Belgium. It was the final match of the 1989–90 European Cup Winners' Cup and the 30th European Cup Winners' Cup final. The final was held at Ullevi in Gothenburg, Sweden, on 9 May 1990. Sampdoria won the match 2–0, thanks to two goals in extra time from Gianluca Vialli.

Route to the final

Match

Details

See also
1989–90 European Cup Winners' Cup
1990 European Cup Final
1990 UEFA Cup Final
R.S.C. Anderlecht in European football
U.C. Sampdoria in European football

External links
UEFA Cup Winners' Cup results at Rec.Sport.Soccer Statistics Foundation

3
Cup Winners' Cup Final 1990
Cup Winners' Cup Final 1990
1990
UEFA Cup Winners' Cup Finals
Cup Winners' Cup Final 1990
Cup Winners' Cup Final 1990
May 1990 sports events in Europe
Football in Gothenburg
International sports competitions in Gothenburg
1990s in Gothenburg